Istrian stew or Jota is a soup made of beans, sauerkraut or sour turnip, potatoes, bacon, spare ribs, known in the northern Adriatic region. It is especially popular in Friuli-Venezia Giulia, Istria and some other parts of northwestern Croatia. Under the name jota, it is also typical of the whole Slovenian Littoral and territories in northeastern Italy, especially in the provinces of Trieste (where it is considered to be the prime example of Triestine food) and Gorizia, and in some peripheral areas of northeastern Friuli (the Torre river valley, and the mountain borderlands of Carnia and Slavia Veneta). The stew originated in Friuli before spreading east and south.  According to the most accredited thesis, "Jota" would derive from the Latin jutta (meaning broth) and has parallels in the ancient friulan language and in modern emilian-romagnol.

The dish shows the influence of both Central European and Mediterranean cuisine. The recipe differs depending on the area. In most of the recipes, olive oil is used, and the main seasoning is garlic. The original Carnic version uses cornmeal. The Triestine version replaces cornmeal with potatoes.

In Slovenian Istria, it is often eaten together with polenta.

See also

References

External links
Istria on the Internet, Gastronomy: Jota history and recipes

Croatian stews
Italian cuisine
Slovenian cuisine
Meat stews
Bacon dishes
Bean soups